New Blood Rising was a professional wrestling pay-per-view (PPV) event produced by World Championship Wrestling (WCW). It took place on August 13, 2000 from the Pacific Coliseum in Vancouver, British Columbia.  The name is a reference to the New Blood faction within WCW (which dissolved before the pay-per-view). The event replaced WCW's August PPV event Road Wild held from 1996 to 1999 and was held on a Sunday instead of a Saturday. Despite never being announced before or during the show, every match on the card was contested under no disqualification rules.
In 2014, All WCW pay-per-views were made available on the WWE Network.

Storylines
The event featured wrestlers from pre-existing scripted feuds and storylines. Wrestlers portrayed villains, heroes, or less distinguishable characters in the scripted events that built tension and culminated in a wrestling match or series of matches.

Reception
In 2007, Arnold Furious of 411Mania gave the event a rating of 2.5 [Very Bad], stating, "One good spotfest, nothing else doing. Fire Russo *clap clap clapclapclap*. It’s now gotten to the point where I can’t watch any more shows Russo has booked. So this is my final WCW flashback. I was planning on going all the way through but it’s such a waste of my time and energy and it’s so depressing I think I’ll do something else instead. Anything else. Thanks for the memories WCW…rot in hell."

Results

*"Canadian Rules" means that, instead of a traditional three-count, the referee must administer a five-count. Following the five-count, the competitor has to stay down for ten seconds. If both men are down for a ten-count for any reason, the first man who gets to his feet wins the match. In addition, there are no submissions and no count-outs.

**After being absent from the pay-per-view due to a (kayfabe) mysterious motorcycle accident, Goldberg did not show up until the middle of the match. Then, in a worked shoot, Goldberg walked out on the match, apparently refusing to take Kevin Nash's Jacknife Powerbomb.

See also

Professional wrestling in Canada

References

Events in Vancouver
World Championship Wrestling pay-per-view events
2000 in British Columbia
Professional wrestling in British Columbia
August 2000 events in Canada
2000 World Championship Wrestling pay-per-view events